This is a list of villages in Chakwal District, Pakistan.

A 
Uthwal 
Arra 
Amirpur Mangon 
Arar Mughlan 
Arar  

B 
Bheen 
Behkri 
Bhagwal Town 
Bhaun Town 
Bilalbad Town 
Badshah Pur 
Basharat Town 
Balkassar Town 
Balokassar 
Bilomar 
Bidher {{Nastaliq|''بھدر }}
Bharpur 
Bhagtal 
BHALLA 
Bhudial (Chakwal) 
BANGWALA 
Budhial (Talagang) 
Begaal 
Bhatti Gujr 
Bhubhar 
Bulay Bala 
Bhawal 
Bhikari Kallan Town 
Buchal Khurd 
Buchal Kalan Town 
Bulah 
Booly 
Bhal Pari 
Ban Ameer Khatoon C 
Chattal 
Chakral 
Chawli 
Chakora Town 
Chakrala 
Chhoie Malot 
Chak Bhon 
Chak Misri 
Chak Narang 
Chak Malook 
Chak Kharak 
Chak Jarre 
Chak Umra 
Chak Chakora 
Chak Ghakar 
Chak Nurang 
Chak Oranky 
Chak Bazeed 
Chak Baqar Shah 
Choa Ganj Ali Shah 
Chumbi  
Chinji 
Chabri 
Chabar 
Chakor 
Chohan D 
Dhudial Town 
Dhoda Town 
Dulmial 
Danda Shah Bilawal Town 
Dharabi 
Dingi Zair  
Dingi Bala 
Dhok Faqira 
Dhok Pathan 
Dhok Chadar 
Dhok Malkan 
Dhok Taliyan 
Dhok Wazira 
Dhok Muhammad Shah 
Dhok Ham 
Dhok Chaudarian 
Dhok Khandoya 
Dhok Naka 
Dhok Parwana 
Dhok Qado 
Dhok Syal 
Dhok Hajian 
Dhok Bhal 
Dhok Bair 
Dhoke Babral 
Dhok Bhal
Dhok Ajri 
Dhoke Bhira
Dhok Hasolian 
Dhok Karak Kabbah 
Dhoke Wadhan
Dhok Murid 
Dhuman 
Dhalal 
Darot 
Dhab Pari 
Dhab Loharan 
Dhab Kalan 
Dhab Khushal 
Dhermond 
Dullah (Basti Abdullah) Town 
Deewaliyan Town 
Dab, Pakistan  
Dalel Pur 
Dhariyala
Dhurnal 
Dhuli 
Dhaku 
Dheedwal 
Dhapai 
Dandoot  
Dalwal 
Dhaular
Dhruggi Rajgan 
Dheri Saidan 
Domeli 
Doray 
Dora 
Dhari 
Damal 
Dhariyala Kahon F 
Fim Kasar 
Fareed Kasar G 
Gahi 
Gah 
Ghazial 
Ghaugh
Gufanwala 
Ghool 
Ghanwal H 
Hastal 
Hasola 
Hasil 
Hajyal 
Haapi 
Haraaj 
Har Do Saba J 
Jabairpur 
Jamalwal 
Jasila 
Jabbi 
Jandala Raika 
Jandial Faizulah 
Jandial Mehmood 
Jand Awan 
Jand Khanzada Town 
Jaswal 
Jhatla Jaswal 
Jhatla (Talagang) 
Jutana 
Jund 
Jewal 
Jhek 
Jorr 
Jethal 
Janga 
Jhalay 
Joya Mair K 
Khanpur, Chakwal Town 
Khewal 
Kurpal 
Khokhar Zer 
Kot Iqbal 
Kot Sarang Town 
Kot Qazi Town 
Kot Rajgan 
Kot Shams 
Kot Gullah 
Kot Raja 
Khandowa 
Kalu jo 
Kaal 
Kahan Pur 
Khengar 
Karim Abad 
Khairpur, Chakwal Town 
Karuli 
Katas 
Khajaula 
Khokhar Bala 
Kariyala 
Karsal 
Khai 
Kaijli 
Kotlay 
Kot Abdal 
Koth Chaudarian 
Kaliyal 
Kahot 
Khanwal 
Khara 
Khoday 
Kalas 
Koliyan 
Karhan 
Kotehra 
Kalan Wali  

Khuian 
Khuian, Talagang Town L 
Liliyandi 
Lakhwal 
Lari Shah Nawaz 
Lilla 
Lafi 
Latifal 
Langa 
Lehr Sultanpur M 
Mangan 
Mulhal Mughlan Town 
Minwal 
Muhra Thaneel 
Muhra Korchasham 
Muhra Sheikhan 
Muhra Lasu 
Muhra Awan 
Muslim Abad 
Murid (Chakwal) 
Matn Khurd 
Matan Kalan 
Multan Khurd 
Munday 
Makhial 
Miani Town 
Munara 
Mahinwal 
Mian Mair 
Manakpur 
Mangwal 
Maghal 
Mona 
Maswal 
Mohra Qazi 
Mohra Malkan 

Muhra Lasu 
Muhra Gujran 
Mohra Shareef 
Mohra Allo 
Makhdom Jahanian  
Mari 
Moolwal 
Meerwal  
Moolay 
Murhal 
Mehro 
Marath 
Mustafa Abad N 
Noopur (Chakwal) 
Neela, Chakwal 
Nachindi 
Noorpur (Kallar Kahar) 
Naka Kaoot  
Nadral 
Nain Sukh  
Narwal 
Noorwal 
Nadral 
Narang Saidan 
Naza Muglah O 
Odherwal Town P 
• Parhal پڑہال

Phatoki 
Pir Phulai Town 
Pindi Gujran Town 
Peera Fatehal 
Panjain 
Pichand Town 
Patalian 
Pidh Town 
Phadial 
Punjdhera 
Padshan 
Patwali 
Pinwal 
Peelo 
 Pipli   پپلی R 
Ratuchha رتوچھہ
Rawal Bala 
Ranja 
Ransial 
Rehn Sadat
Rehra 
Roopwal 
Rabal 
Narang Sydan S 
Sangwala 
Sahgalabad Town 
Saghar 
Saidpur 
Shahpur Saidan 
Sadwal 
Shahpur Bilokassar 
Shah Said Bullo 
Sangwala 
Satwak 
Sar 
Sarkalan 
Sawar 
Saba Rajgan 
Sohei
Simbal 
Sarkal Mair 
Sarkal Kassar 
Saral 
Salaoi 
Sehti 
Saka 
Sosian 
Sidhar 
Sikriala 
Siraal 
Sutwal 
Suhair 
Sang Kalan 
Sohaw T 
Takia Shah Murad 
Thanil Kamal 
Thaneel Fatohi 
Thirpal 
Tuti Bann  
Tatral  (Chakwal) 
Tatral (Choa Saidan Shah) 
Thoa Bahadur Shah Town 
Thoa Mehrum Khan 
 Thoha Hamayoun [Village]
Tarimni 
Thathi 
Tehti 
Tamman 
Tharmal Dhewal U 
Uthwal V 
Vasnal 
Vero W''' 
Wanhar (Talagang) 
Warwaal 
Wahali Zair 
Wariamal 
Wahdry 
Waola 

 
Chakwal District
Chakwal